Manipulated is a remix album by Gravity Kills, which was released by TVT Records. It features several remix tracks from well-known musicians in the industrial music scene, including: Al Jourgensen, Praga Khan and Martin Atkins.

Track listing

Gravity Kills albums
1997 remix albums
TVT Records remix albums